Frances Tomelty (born 6 October 1948) is a Northern Irish actress whose numerous television credits include Strangers (1978–1979), Testament of Youth (1979), Inspector Morse (1988), Cracker (1993), The Amazing Mrs Pritchard (2006), The White Queen (2013) and Unforgotten (2015). Her theatre roles include playing Kate in the original production of Dancing at Lughnasa in Dublin (1990). She was married to the musician Sting from 1976 to 1984.

Early life
Tomelty was born in Belfast, Northern Ireland, the daughter of actor Joseph Tomelty (1911–1995).

Career
Tomelty's television work has included Survivors, Bergerac, Blue Money, Inspector Morse, Lucy Sullivan is Getting Married, Strangers, Midsomer Murders, Coronation Street, Cracker, Spooks, Casualty, The Amazing Mrs Pritchard, Holby City, Law & Order: UK, The Royal, Waking the Dead, Silent Witness,  Unforgotten, Catastrophe, Death in Paradise as well as big-budget adaptations Atlantis, Merlin, The White Queen, and A Perfect Spy.

On film, she has acted in Bellman and True, Monk Dawson, Bullshot, The Field, and Chéri.

Tomelty's theatre roles include Elaine Navazio in Last of the Red Hot Lovers by Neil Simon (1979 British premiere directed by Eric Thompson at the Royal Exchange, Manchester); Mia Schuurman in In the Talking Dark by Dolores Walshe (1989) (directed by Braham Murray at the Royal Exchange, Manchester); Kate in Dancing at Lughnasa by Brian Friel (1990) (directed by Patrick Mason at the Abbey Theatre, Dublin); Momma in Doctor Heart by Peter Muller (1991 British premiere directed by Braham Murray at the Royal Exchange, Manchester); and Mrs Alving in Ghosts by Henrik Ibsen (2000) (directed by Braham Murray at the Royal Exchange, Manchester). Tomelty also portrayed Lady Macbeth in the Old Vic's disastrous 1980 production of Macbeth, with Peter O'Toole in the title role.

Personal life
On 1 May 1976, Tomelty married musician Sting – best known as the lead singer and bassist for the rock band The Police – after knowing him for two years. They met on the set of a rock-musical called Rock Nativity. She played the Virgin Mary; he played in the band. They have two children together, Joseph and Fuschia Katherine “Kate” Sumner. Tomelty and Sting divorced in 1984 following Sting's affair with actress Trudie Styler. The split was controversial. As The Independent reported in 2006, Tomelty "just happened" to be Styler's best friend; "Sting and Frances lived next door to Trudie in Bayswater, west London, for several years" before Sting and Styler began their relationship.

References

External links
 

Sting (musician)
1948 births
Living people
Actresses from Belfast
Television actresses from Northern Ireland
Stage actresses from Northern Ireland
20th-century actresses from Northern Ireland
21st-century actresses from Northern Ireland
Sumner musical family